Castañeo'l Monte ("Castañedo del Monte" in Spanish)  is a parish in Santo Adriano, a municipality within the province and autonomous community of Asturias, in northern Spain. 

The population is 36 (2007). The postal code is 33115.

The Asturian people of this parish live in several villages:
 Castañeo'l Monte
 El Cabezu
 Los Niseiros

Fiesta days include:
 San Romano, 9 August
 Arcángel San Gabriel, 29 September
 San Antonio, 13 June

References

External links
 Asturian society of economic and industrial studies, English language version of "Sociedad Asturiana de Estudios Económicos e Industriales" (SADEI)

Parishes in Santo Adriano